Clara Barton School is a historic school building located in the Feltonville neighborhood of Philadelphia.  It was designed by Irwin T. Catharine and built in 1924-1925.  It is a three-story, eight bay, yellow brick building in the Art Deco-style. It features an entrance with decorative terra cotta panels and a terra cotta cornice.  It was named for American Red Cross founder Clara Barton (1821-1912).

It was added to the National Register of Historic Places in 1988.

References

School buildings on the National Register of Historic Places in Philadelphia
Art Deco architecture in Pennsylvania
School buildings completed in 1925
Hunting Park, Philadelphia
School
1925 establishments in Pennsylvania